Valle Hermoso may refer to:

Argentina: Valle Hermoso, Córdoba
Chile: Valle Hermoso, Valparaíso
Mexico: Valle Hermoso, Tamaulipas
United States: Valle Hermoso, Texas

See also
Vallehermoso (disambiguation)